Jim Wearne (born 1950) is a Cornish-American singer-songwriter.

(The surname is pronounced in one syllable to rhyme with "cairn")  Born in St. Louis, Missouri, United states, he was raised in the Chicago area.  Early interests in music and theatre led to a desire to become a performer.  He learned to play the guitar in his teens, and performed mostly folk music at local venues. He studied theatre at Southern Illinois University, receiving a BS in theatre in 1972. His working career has included many occupations, including stagehand, salesman, meeting coordinator, retailer, and instructor, but his avocation has always been music.

His researches into folk music and family history led him to an interest in things Cornish, and Cornish music in particular. He has since written many songs on Cornish themes, and performs these songs and traditional Cornish material at festivals throughout the USA, and in Cornwall. His interest in Cornwall has led to a sympathy with the movement to establish national status for Cornwall within the United Kingdom. His song This Isn't England includes the lyric "This isn't England, you stupid twit!"

Wearne is notable as one of only two known exclusive proponents/performers of Cornish music in North America (the other being Marion Howard of Wisconsin.)  Reviews of his work in publications such as Cornish World and Dirty Linen credit him with bringing the music, people and culture of Cornwall to America, where it is little known.

In spring 2002 at Castel Pendynas, Pendennis, Falmouth in Cornwall, Wearne was made a Bard of the Cornish Gorsedd for services to Cornish Music in America (in Cornish: Rag gonys dhe Ylow Kernewek yn Ameryky) with the bardic name Canor Gwanethtyr - Singer of the Prairie.

Recordings
Here and There, ASIN: B001DGSDYU, July 22, 2008,
So Low, ASIN: B000QOS24Q
Kowetha, ASIN: B000LPR9O4, November 16, 2006
Howl Lowen
Me and Cousin Jack

Books
"Basic Homebrewing: Storey Country Wisdom Bulletin A-144", J.Wearne, Storey Publications, 1995, 
"The Adventure of the Old Campaigners" (Novel), J. Wearne, Mr. Bear Ent./BookBaby, 2011, 
"The World.  Around it.  On a Ship. Mostly." (Travel/adventure Non-Fiction)BookBaby, 2017

References

1950 births
Living people
Bards of Gorsedh Kernow
Musicians from St. Louis
Southern Illinois University alumni
American folk musicians
American people of Cornish descent
Cornish folk musicians